Drush (DRUpal SHell) is a computer software shell-based application used to control, manipulate, and administer Drupal websites. On the surface, drush is a tool for updating site modules, however Drush has a more comprehensive list of features.

Details
Drush was originally developed by Arto Bendiken for Drupal 4.7. In May 2007, it was partly rewritten and redesigned for Drupal 5 by Franz Heinzmann. Drush is maintained by Moshe Weitzman with the support of Owen Barton, greg.1.anderson, jonhattan, Mark Sonnabaum, Jonathan Hedstrom and Christopher Gervais.

External links

References 

Web applications